Joshua Watt (born 31 August 1993) is a Scottish footballer who plays for Queen's Park. He plays as a right-sided winger.

Career
Watt is a product of the Motherwell youth system. His good performances for the Under-19 side were enough to earn him a new contract with the club.

On 17 October 2012, with first-team opportunities limited, Watt joined Lanarkshire derby rivals Airdrie United on a three-month loan. He made his debut in a club-record 7–0 defeat against Partick Thistle.

On 5 March 2013, he joined Raith Rovers on loan. On 20 May 2013, Watt's contract was not extended by Motherwell.

On 24 July 2013, Watt moved to Icelandic football and joined Íþróttabandalag Akraness.

On 3 October 2013, Watt signed for Scottish League One side Stenhousemuir. On 10 January 2014, he moved to East Stirlingshire on a one-month loan deal.

Career statistics

References

External links

1993 births
Living people
Scottish footballers
Association football wingers
Motherwell F.C. players
Airdrieonians F.C. players
Raith Rovers F.C. players
Josh Watt
Scottish Premier League players
Scottish Football League players
Úrvalsdeild karla (football) players
Expatriate footballers in Iceland
Stenhousemuir F.C. players
East Stirlingshire F.C. players
Scottish Professional Football League players
Scottish Junior Football Association players